Babu Khan is an Indian politician and a member of the 16th Legislative Assembly in India. He represents the Shahabad constituency of Uttar Pradesh and is a member of the Samajwadi Party political party.

Early life and education
Babu  Khan was born in Hardoi district. He attended the C. S. N. Degree College,  Hardoi and holds a Bachelor's degree.

Political career
Babu Khan has been a MLA for four terms. He represented the Shahabad constituency and is a member of the Samajwadi Party political party. During his first term, he contested as an Independent candidate.

Posts held

See also

 Shahabad (Assembly constituency)
 Sixteenth Legislative Assembly of Uttar Pradesh
 Uttar Pradesh Legislative Assembly

References 

1949 births
Living people
People from Hardoi district
Samajwadi Party politicians
Uttar Pradesh MLAs 1991–1993
Uttar Pradesh MLAs 1993–1996
Uttar Pradesh MLAs 1997–2002
Uttar Pradesh MLAs 2012–2017
Uttar Pradesh politicians